Pardomima phalaromima is a moth in the family Crambidae. It was described by Edward Meyrick in 1933. It is found in Angola, Cameroon, the Republic of the Congo, the Democratic Republic of the Congo (Kinshasa, Equateur, Orientale, Katanga), Equatorial Guinea (Bioko), Guinea, Ivory Coast, Kenya, Malawi, Nigeria, Sierra Leone and Tanzania.

References

Moths described in 1933
Spilomelinae